Peter Rogers (20 February 1914 – 14 April 2009) was an English film producer.  He is best known for his involvement in the making of the Carry On series of films.

Life and career
Rogers began his career as a journalist for his local paper, before graduating to scriptwriting religious informational films. He progressed to film production, working with director Gerald Thomas, the first work being a production for the Children's Film Foundation. Rogers is best known as producer of the Carry On series of British comedy films, beginning with Carry On Sergeant in 1958. There were 31 films in all. Rogers had also been linked with a further instalment, Carry On London, which has been in pre-production for several years, but since his death seems unlikely to be made.

The majority of Rogers' work, including all the Carry On films, were made at Pinewood Studios in Iver Heath, Buckinghamshire, England. His other credits included Appointment with Venus starring David Niven, and Time Lock in which Sean Connery made one of his earliest film appearances.

Rogers' other production ventures include the television series Ivanhoe with Roger Moore and the film adaptation of the long-running sitcom Bless This House with Carry On regular Sid James.

His wife was the film producer Betty Box, responsible for the Doctor series of films. Peter and Betty lived for many years at a large home in Beaconsfield, "Drummers Yard", that had been purchased from the actor Dirk Bogarde.

An authorized biography, Mr Carry On: The Life and Work of Peter Rogers (BBC) by Morris Bright and Robert Ross (author of The Carry On Companion and the Monty Python Encyclopedia) was published in 2000, with extensive input from Rogers. It attempted to defend him against charges that he exploited the cast of the Carry On films, by paying the lead actors an unchanged £5,000 per film, from the first in 1958 to the penultimate movie.

Rogers attended the 50th anniversary of the Carry On films held at Pinewood Studios in March 2008. He died on 14 April 2009, having been ill for several months.

References

External links

What a Carry On
Carry On Films at The Whippit Inn
 Obituary, Daily Telegraph, 15 April 2009
 Obituary, The Times, 16 April 2009

1914 births
2009 deaths
English film producers
People educated at King's School, Rochester
People from Rochester, Kent
20th-century English businesspeople